Catello Amarante may refer to:

 Catello Amarante (rower, born 1979), Italian rower
 Catello Amarante (rower, born 1990), Italian rower